The 2018 Unibet Masters was the sixth staging of the non-ranking Masters darts tournament, held by the Professional Darts Corporation (PDC). It was held from 26–28 January 2018 at the Arena MK in Milton Keynes, England.

Michael van Gerwen was the defending champion, after defeating Gary Anderson 11–7 in the 2017 final, and he successfully retained his title, by beating Raymond van Barneveld 11–9 in the final. It was Van Gerwen's fourth consecutive Masters title.

Qualifiers
The Masters only features the top 16 players in the PDC Order of Merit. The following players comprised the top 16 of the PDC Order of Merit after the 2018 PDC World Darts Championship, with the exception of Phil Taylor, who despite being #4 in the rankings, had announced his retirement, following the final of the World Championship:

 Michael van Gerwen (winner)
 Peter Wright (quarter-finals)
 Rob Cross (quarter-finals)
 Gary Anderson (semi-finals)
 Daryl Gurney (first round)
 Mensur Suljović (semi-finals)
 Dave Chisnall (first round)
 Simon Whitlock (first round)
 James Wade (quarter-finals)
 Raymond van Barneveld (runner-up)
 Michael Smith (first round)
 Gerwyn Price (quarter-finals)
 Benito van de Pas (first round)
 Ian White (first round)
 Alan Norris (first round)
 Kim Huybrechts (first round)

Prize money
The prize money is £200,000 in total. The prize money is the same as in 2017.

Draw

References

External links

Masters
Masters (darts)
Masters (darts)
Masters (darts)
Sport in Milton Keynes